Sorbus poteriifolia is a species of rowan native to south-central China and northern Myanmar. It is a shrub found at 3000 to 4000m above sea level. It has gained the Royal Horticultural Society's Award of Garden Merit as an ornamental.

References

poteriifolia
Plants described in 1925